Duane D. Horsman (January 23, 1937 – July 1991), was a middleweight professional boxer from Minnesota.

Personal life
Horsman was a native of Chatfield, Minnesota.

Professional career
In a career that spanned from 1959 to 1970, Duane Horsman amassed a record of 48 wins (34 by knockout) and 13 losses, with 2 draws.  He began his career with 12 straight wins and was undefeated after 20 fights.  Before his career was over he had fought such notable opponents as Clarence Cook, Sugar Boy Nando, Del Flanagan, Art Hernandez, Pat O'Connor.

Notes

Two other notable fighters the Chatfield Chopper, professional middleweight boxer- Duane Horsman fought (recalling "The Horse" head on the back of his fighter's robe), were Ralph "Tiger" Jones, and Doug McCleod.

External links

1937 births
1991 deaths
People from Chatfield, Minnesota
Boxers from Minnesota
American male boxers
Middleweight boxers